Sampo Koskinen (born 1 March 1979) is a Finnish former professional footballer who is the assistant coach of FC Honka in the Veikkausliiga in Finland. As a player, he spent most of his career in his native country with FC Honka. He also played for Norwegian Premier League side Sandefjord Fotball, in the Netherlands for RBC Roosendaal and for Swedish clubs IFK Göteborg and Boden.

References

External links
 
 
 
 Sampo Koskinen at FC Honka 

Living people
1979 births
Association football defenders
Finnish footballers
Finnish expatriate footballers
FC Honka players
FC Jokerit players
RBC Roosendaal players
IFK Göteborg players
Bodens BK players
Sandefjord Fotball players
Veikkausliiga players
Eliteserien players
Eredivisie players
Allsvenskan players
Finnish expatriate sportspeople in the Netherlands
Expatriate footballers in the Netherlands
Finnish expatriate sportspeople in Sweden
Expatriate footballers in Sweden
Finnish expatriate sportspeople in Norway
Expatriate footballers in Norway
People from Kirkkonummi
Sportspeople from Uusimaa